The Women's team time trial of the 2016 UCI Road World Championships was a cycling event that took place on 9 October 2016 in Doha, Qatar.

Course

Qualification
The following UCI Women's Teams in the UCI Team Ranking as of 15 August 2016 were invited to take part. Teams in bold elected to compete in the race.

Preview
Only eight teams were at the start of the race. The previous four editions were won by the former  team by different riders each year.

Race
The race took place in  heat, with not a great atmosphere, criticised by several teams and riders.

, with Ellen van Dijk as the main engine, were second at the first intermediate time point, 9.21 seconds behind  after .

Final classification

References

Women's team time trial
UCI Road World Championships – Women's team time trial
2016 in women's road cycling